Rais Kola or Rais Kala may refer to:
 Rais Kola, Babol (رييس كلا - Ra’īs Kolā)
 Rais Kola, Nur (رئيس كلا - Ra’īs Kolā)
 Rais Kola, Savadkuh (رئيس كلا - Ra’īs Kolā)